Purity Ring are a Canadian electronic music duo formed in 2010 consisting of Megan James and Corin Roddick.

Studio albums

Extended plays

Singles

As lead artists

As featured artists

Promotional singles
 "Ungirthed" (2011)
 "Lofticries" (2012)
 "Belispeak II" (featuring Danny Brown) (2012)
 "Grammy" (2013)
 "Amenamy" (Jon Hopkins Remix) (2013)
 "Begin Again (Health Remix)" (2015)

Remixes

Production credits

Music videos

Notes

References 

Discographies of Canadian artists
Pop music discographies
Electronic music discographies